Musical Moods was a Canadian music television series which aired on CBC Television in 1958.

Premise
Eric Wild and his orchestra were featured in this Winnipeg-produced series. Each episode was based on the theme of a specific mood. For example, an episode would be billed as "music in a romantic mood."

Scheduling
This half-hour series was broadcast Tuesdays at 10:30 p.m. (Eastern) from 4 March to 10 June 1958.

References

External links
 

CBC Television original programming
1950s Canadian music television series
1958 Canadian television series debuts
1958 Canadian television series endings
Black-and-white Canadian television shows
Television shows filmed in Winnipeg